AA Tauri is a young variable star in the equatorial constellation of Taurus, located in the Taurus-Auriga star-forming region. It is too faint to view with the naked eye, having an apparent visual magnitude that varies from 12.2 down to 16.1. The star is located  approximately 447 light years away from the Sun based on parallax, and is drifting further away with a radial velocity of +17 km/s.

The stellar classification for this object is K7Ve, matching a K-type main-sequence star that displays emission features. It is an eruptive variable of the T Tauri type with an estimated age of 2.4 million years. The object has 76% of the mass of the Sun, 181% of the Sun's radius, and is spinning with a projected rotational velocity of 13 km/s. AA Tauri is radiating 80% of the luminosity of the Sun at an effective temperature of 4,060 K.

Variability 

AA Tauri shows brightness variations of one to two magnitudes over an 8.2-day period.  The brightness has been described as "roughly constant, interrupted by quasi-cyclic fading episodes".  The periodic variations are ascribed to eclipses of the star by a warped dust disk around it.

In 2011, AA Tauri faded by about two magnitudes and has remained at the fainter level since then.  The star also became significantly more reddened. The eight-day variations continue, with a maximum brightness now around magnitude 14 and magnitude 16.5 at its faintest.  It is theorised that the root cause of this dimness is a warp in the accretion disk, located at a distance of 7.7 AU or more from the centre, that was brought into the line of sight by its elliptical motion around the central star.

A possible planetary system

In their paper of 2003, Grinin et al. invoke the possible presence of a substellar object to explain peculiar and periodic eclipses occurring to the young star every 8.3 days. They infer a mass of 20 times that of Jupiter for the perturbing object and an orbital separation of 0.08 Astronomical Units.  Later studies find no evidence for a planet, instead finding multiple rings with accretion streams between them.

References

K-type main-sequence stars
T Tauri stars
Hypothetical planetary systems

Taurus (constellation)
Tauri, AA
J04345542+2428531
IRAS catalogue objects